Tenderness is an album by Kip Hanrahan that was released in 1990.  It includes guest work by Sting, Alfredo "Chocolate" Armenteros, and Giovanni Hidalgo.

Critical reception
The Boston Globe said the album "blurs the lines between jazz, rock and Latin music with a raw, sensual complexity through this mysterious 16-song cycle."

The Philadelphia Inquirer listed Tenderness as one of its "10 best pop albums of 1990".

Track listing

Personnel
 Kip Hanrahan – voice, percussion
 Alfredo "Chocolate" Armenteros – trumpet
 Chico Freeman – tenor saxophone
 Don Pullen – piano
 Alfredo Triff – violin
 Leo Nocentelli – electric and acoustic guitars
 Sting – voice, bass guitar
 Fernando Saunders – voice, bass guitar
 Diahnne Abbott – voice
 Carmen Lundy – voice
 Lucy Penabaz – voice
 Robby Ameen – drums, traps
 Ignacio Berroa – drums, traps
 Andrew Cyrille – drums, traps
 Marvin Smith – drums, traps
 Cecilia Engelhardt – percussion
 Richie Flores – percussion, congas
 Giovanni Hidalgo – percussion, congas, quinto
 Andy González – double bass
 Milton Cardona – percussion, congas

References

1990 albums
Jazz albums by American artists